Changes is the debut studio album by American metalcore band For the Fallen Dreams. It was released on January 8, 2008, through Rise Records and was produced by Joey Sturgis.

Release
On July 23, 2007, the band announced they had signed to Rise Records. On September 9, the group announced they would release an album in late fall. On the same day, "Brothers in Arms" was posted on their Myspace account. The album was released through Rise Records on January 8, 2008. In January and February, the band embarked on the Rise Records Tour alongside Every Bridge Burned, Recon, American Me, and It Prevails. In February and March 2009, the band went on a tour of the UK and Europe alongside A Day to Remember and Azriel.

Track listing

Personnel

For the Fallen Dreams
Chad Ruhlig – lead vocals
Jim Hocking – lead guitar, backing vocals on track 10, "Through the Looking Glass"
Marcus Morgan – rhythm guitar
Joe Ellis – bass guitar, backing vocals
Andrew Tkaczyk – drums, percussion, songwriting

Additional musicians
Chris Aslip of Suffocate Faster – guest vocals on track 8, "Vengeance"
Matt Hasting of MyChildren MyBride – guest vocals on track 9, "Falling Down"

Additional personnel
Joey Sturgis – production, engineering, mixing, mastering, setup, programming
Chris Rubey of The Devil Wears Prada – design, layout

References

2008 debut albums
For the Fallen Dreams albums
Rise Records albums
Albums produced by Joey Sturgis